Pierre Norman Bruce Hutton (16 July 192820 July 2014) was an Australian diplomat.

Personal life 
Born on 16 July 1928 in Tasmania, Hutton was educated at St Virgil's College and the University of Tasmania. Graduating with a Bachelor of Commerce in 1948, Hutton joined the Commonwealth Public Service in the Department of External Affairs in 1949 as a diplomatic cadet.

Hutton died on 20 July 2014.

Career 
Hutton's early overseas posts were to Bangkok, Rangoon, Ottawa and New Caledonia.

After heading the Department's Malaysian/Indonesian section (1962–1964) and a posting as First Secretary to Geneva (1964–1967), in October 1967, Hutton was appointed the Department's public information officer, responsible for assisting Australian media report accurately on foreign affairs, from the Australian angle. He declined to be photographed by The Canberra Times in his first week in the role. He headed a team of three public information officers, all with diplomatic backgrounds. From the role as public information officer, Hutton was appointed High Commissioner to Nigeria in February 1970—his first post as head of mission.

He was Ambassador to Lebanon from 1973 to 1975, in the lead-up to the start of the Lebanese Civil War. Arriving in April 1973, within days Hutton and his family were in the midst of fighting. His wife and four of his five children were forced to hide in the basement of a school for 11 hours, with teachers and other pupils, while Palestinians and units of the Lebanese Army exchanged fire above. During his posting in Beirut, Hutton was also appointed the first non-resident ambassador to Iraq (in 1974) and to Jordan and Syria (in 1975).

Hutton was later an Ambassador to Egypt, the Sudan and finally to Switzerland, where he was also Representative to the UN Human Rights Commission.

Bibliography

References 

1928 births
2014 deaths
Consuls-General of Australia in Noumea
Ambassadors of Australia to Egypt
Ambassadors of Australia to Iraq
Ambassadors of Australia to Jordan
Ambassadors of Australia to Lebanon
Ambassadors of Australia to Switzerland
Ambassadors of Australia to Syria
High Commissioners of Australia to Nigeria
University of Tasmania alumni